The Benin women's national under-18 basketball team is a national basketball team of Benin, administered by the Fédération Béninoise de Basketball.
It represents the country in international under-18 (under age 18) women's basketball competitions.

See also
Benin men's national under-18 basketball team

References

External links
Archived records of Benin team participations

Basketball in Benin
Basketball teams in Benin
Women's national under-18 basketball teams
Basketball
Women's basketball in Benin